Fuzzy-Wuzzy can refer to:

 Hadendoa, an East African tribe
 Fuzzy-Wuzzy, a poem by Rudyard Kipling
 Fuzzy Wuzzy Angels,  the name given to Papua New Guineans who assisted injured Australian troops during World War II
 Formerly one of the shades of brown Crayola crayon colors